The Payra 1320 MW Thermal Power Plant is a 1,320 megawatt coal-fired power station built in Kalapara Upazila of Patuakhali District in southern Bangladesh. It is a joint venture between the North-West Power Generation Company Bangladesh Limited (NWPGCL) and China National Machinery Import and Export Corporation (CMC).

History 
On 19 March 2015, a deal was signed between NWPGCL and the CMC to set up the Payra Power Plant. The joint venture was named Bangladesh-China Power Company Limited (BCPCL). On 29 March 2016, BCPCL signed an engineering, procurement and construction (EPC) contract with consortium of NEPC &CECC for the installation of the power plant.

About 
The plant consists of two units, each with a capacity of 660 MW. The estimated cost was around US$1.56 billion. The plant has been built on an area of 397-hectare. The first unit came into commercial operation on the 15th May 2020 and the second unit on the 8th December 2020.
Presently, it is the largest electricity generating unit of Bangladesh that is currently in operation. On the 21st March 2022, PM Sheikh Hasina inaugurated the power plant after it was fully completed.

See also

 Electricity sector in Bangladesh
 List of power stations in Bangladesh

References

External links

Fossil fuel power stations in Bangladesh
Proposed coal-fired power stations
Proposed power stations in Bangladesh
Proposed buildings and structures in Bangladesh
Coal in Bangladesh
Coal-fired power stations in Bangladesh